72 may refer to:

 72 (number)
 One of the years 72 BC, AD 72, 1972, 2072 
 "72", by James from the album Hey Ma

See also
 List of highways numbered